Ken Kagaya may refer to:
 Ken Kagaya (politician)
 Ken Kagaya (artist)